Marion Kozak or Marion Kozak Miliband (born 1934 as Dobra Jenta Kozak, also known as Maria Kozak) is a Polish-born British activist. She emigrated to the United Kingdom in the 1950s. In 1961, she married Ralph Miliband (1924–1994). Their two sons, David Miliband and Ed Miliband, have risen to prominence in modern-day British politics.

Early life and education
Kozak is the daughter of wealthy Jewish parents, Bronislawa (née Landau) and Dawid Kozak, in the Polish town of Częstochowa. In 1939 when the Germans took control, about 40,000, a quarter of Częstochowa's population, were Jewish. The Kozaks' factory was commandeered and transformed into a munitions plant. In the town, an estimated 2,000 Jews were murdered by Germans on the spot and another 40,000 were transported to the gas chambers at the Treblinka extermination camp. At some point Polish nuns in a convent took the Kozaks in and hid them from the Germans. Marion refuses to divulge where or when this took place. She also credits the "kindness and generosity of acquaintances in Warsaw" for her survival. She was also known as Maria. In a biography of her husband Ralph Miliband, written by a family friend, Michael Newman, states that: "For the rest of the war Marion, Hadassa and their mother had been in constant danger and owed their lives to several brave people, Jewish and non-Jewish, many of whom were themselves killed."

In 2009 David Miliband, in his capacity as the Foreign Secretary, expressed his thanks to the Polish people for having saved his mother during the Holocaust. During an official visit to Poland he said: "My mother was born here, her life was saved by those who risked theirs [by] sheltering her from Nazi oppression". Newspaper reports stated that "his paternal grandparents were also Polish Jews".

According to The Guardian, Marion Kozak had once been a student (at the London School of Economics) of the Marxist scholar Ralph Miliband. She also has a PhD in Economic and Social History from the University of Hull,  where she submitted a thesis in 1976 on "Women munition workers during the First World War with special reference to engineering".

Marriage to Ralph Miliband
Kozak and Ralph Miliband married in 1961. Her background and politics were similar to his, and she had a comparable, though less high-profile, career as an activist and academic. Yet she was more outgoing and had broader interests. In 1965 their son David Miliband was born. Kozak hosted relatives, left-wing writers, dissidents such as Joe Slovo of the South African Communist Party, academics from abroad, the occasional politician. Sons David and Ed Miliband (born 1969) were encouraged to join in.

Political views
Kozak has been described in London's The Jewish Chronicle as a long-standing human rights campaigner and an early activist for the Campaign for Nuclear Disarmament (in parallel with being described as keeping "a low profile" and being "a very private woman"). Kozak is also described as being "a long-standing supporter of left-wing pro-Palestinian organisations" and is a signatory of the founding statements of both Jews for Justice for Palestinians (founded 2002) and a supporter of Independent Jewish Voices (launched 2007).
Long-time friend Tariq Ali wrote in The Guardian in 2015 that Kozak was a "strong-minded socialist and feminist".

Influence and stance towards her sons
A BBC report described Kozak as a "campaigning mother" who, unlike her husband Ralph, remained loyal to the British Labour Party. However, she is thought to have been a greater influence on the political development of her sons. "There's no doubt that Ed got a lot of his drive from Marion and a lot of his feel for nitty-gritty grassroots politics from Marion too," according to Dr. Marc Stears, politics fellow at the University of Oxford. Friends have stated that the contest between the brothers has been a huge "strain" for their mother and that she has even told people it would have been much easier had they simply become academics rather than politicians. She was reported as "maintain[ing] a low profile" in 2010 when Ed Miliband defeated David Miliband to become leader of the Opposition in the United Kingdom.

Ed Miliband has admitted "my mum probably doesn't agree with me...but like most mums is too kind to say so."

Publications
Taking Action: Greenpeace. Heinemann Library, 1997.

See also
History of the Jews in the United Kingdom
History of the Jews in Poland
List of Holocaust survivors
Rescue of Jews by Poles during the Holocaust
The Holocaust in Poland

References

1934 births
Alumni of the London School of Economics
Campaign for Nuclear Disarmament activists
British human rights activists
Women human rights activists
British feminists
British socialists
Ed Miliband
English Ashkenazi Jews
English people of Polish-Jewish descent
Holocaust survivors
Jewish activists
Living people
People from Częstochowa
Polish emigrants to the United Kingdom
British socialist feminists
Jewish socialists
Alumni of the University of Hull